2048: Nowhere to Run (known in China and Taiwan as 2048: No Escape or 2048: Nowhere to Escape; alternatively known as Blade Runner 2048) is a 2017 American neo-noir science fiction short film acting as a prequel to the feature film Blade Runner 2049 and the sequel to the short film 2036: Nexus Dawn. It is one of three such prequels, alongside Blade Runner Black Out 2022 and 2036: Nexus Dawn. The short was released on September 16, 2017, approximately three weeks before the release of the feature film, and features Dave Bautista as Blade Runner 2049 character Sapper Morton, alongside Orion Ben. The film was written by Hampton Fancher and Michael Green, who also wrote the feature film, and directed by Luke Scott, whose father Ridley Scott directed the original Blade Runner and is executive producer on the sequel Blade Runner 2049.

The film takes place in Los Angeles in 2048, one year before the events of Blade Runner 2049, and tells the story of Morton's protecting of a mother and daughter from thugs, ultimately leading to his status as a replicant being reported.

Plot 
In Los Angeles, in 2048, Sapper Morton is shown weeping hysterically into a mirror. He washes his face in a sink and puts on his glasses. Walking through a crowded street, he is briefly accosted by a group of thugs, whom he ignores. Greeted by Ella, he gives her the book The Power and the Glory to read, a book that he enjoyed. Leaving, Sapper goes to a market to sell leeches he has farmed, being paid $3,000, which is $1,000 less than Sapper needs. After leaving the market, Sapper sees Ella and her mother about to be sexually assaulted by the group of thugs he had earlier ignored. Angered, Sapper proceeds to savagely beat the group and kills most of them, demonstrating superhuman strength and endurance in the process. Seeing Ella and her mother terrified at the violence, a remorseful Sapper leaves the scene, having dropped his identification papers. A spectator, having watched Sapper earlier, calls the LAPD to inform them that he thinks he has found a rogue "skin-job".

Chinese prologue

The Chinese version of the film has a prologue consisting of a wall of text before the film begins. The text explains that replicant production was banned after "the Blackout" in 2022, leading to the bankruptcy of the Tyrell Corporation; additionally, the text explains that the Earth's ecosystem has been on the brink of collapse since the mid-2020s. Niander Wallace, the blind CEO of the Wallace Corporation, is explained to have acquired the Tyrell Corporation, and have begun to develop a new generation of replicants to serve as a slave force to help rebuild the Earth's environment. This prologue previously appeared before Blade Runner short film 2036: Nexus Dawn.

Cast 

 Dave Bautista as Sapper Morton, a Nexus-8 replicant.
 Gerard Miller as Salt
 Gaia Ottman as Ella
 Björn Freiberg as spectator
 Orion Ben as Ella's mother
 Adam Savage as shop patron (cameo)

Release
On August 29, 2017, it was announced that Denis Villeneuve had selected various filmmakers to direct three short films exploring incidents that occurred between the events of Blade Runner and Blade Runner 2049. The second film, 2048: Nowhere to Run is directed by Luke Scott, and follows Nexus-8 replicant Sapper Morton as he protects a mother and daughter from thugs. Scott previously directed 2036: Nexus Dawn.

Reception
2048: Nowhere to Run was met with appreciation for providing Dave Bautista with a role worthy of his talents.

See also 
 Artificial intelligence

References

External links 

 
 
 

Blade Runner (franchise)
American science fiction short films
2010s science fiction films
Cyberpunk films
American dystopian films
Films based on works by Philip K. Dick
Films set in 2048
Alcon Entertainment films
Scott Free Productions films
Warner Bros. short films
Columbia Pictures short films
Films set in Los Angeles
Films shot in Budapest
Films shot in Hungary
American post-apocalyptic films
2010s English-language films
2010s American films